Two ships in the United States Navy have been named USS Simpson. The first was named for Rear Admiral Edward Simpson and the second was named for Rear Admiral Rodger W. Simpson.

 The second  was an  guided missile frigate, commissioned in 1985 and decommissioned in 2015.

United States Navy ship names